The Praça do Império (Empire Square) is a city square and park situated adjacent to principal monuments and tourist attractions in the civil parish of Belém, municipality and Portuguese capital of Lisbon.

History

Between 23 June and 2 December 1940, Lisbon realized the Exposição do Mundo Português (Portuguese World Exposition), that included an urbanization plan that encompassed the area of Belém, that included the Praça do Império. The sculptures of the seahorses, that dominate the site, were completed by sculptor António Duarte were installed in 1940.

A project to construct the Palácio do Ultramar (Overseas Palace) was initiated in 1952, situated on the eastern edge of the park, authored by architects Cristino da Silva and Jacques Carlu.

In 1973, a commemorative monument to the poet Augusto Gil (1873-1929) was installed on the site, that included a bronze medallion and inscription by the municipal council of Lisbon.

The roads around the square were used as a special stage in the 2011 to 2014 Rally de Portugal.

Architecture
The park is situated to the south of the Monastery of Santa Maria de Belém and west of the Centro Cultural de Belém.

The rectangular  square consists of successive quadrangles, that structure the space into passages and greenspaces. On the extreme edges of the southern part of the square, along the Avenida da Índia are hippocamp statues (seahorses), over reflecting pools.

References

Notes

Sources
 
 
 
 
 

Squares in Lisbon
Belém (Lisbon)
National squares
World's fair sites in Portugal